The 2009 Maine Black Bears football team was an American football team that represented the University of Maine as a member of the Colonial Athletic Association (CAA) during the 2009 NCAA Division I FCS football season. In their 17th season under head coach Jack Cosgrove, the Black Bears compiled a 5–6 record (4–4 against conference opponents) and finished second in the CAA's North Division. Mike Brusko, Brandon McLaughlin, and Jordan Stevens were the team captains.

Schedule

References

Maine
Maine Black Bears football seasons
Maine Black Bears football